Ultrasport was a Norwegian extreme sports magazine. The magazine was started in 1991. In 2001 the magazine published nude photos of Kari Traa, which caused public outcry in Norway. In 2006 the magazine was acquired by Cicero Norway AS. It ceased publication in 2008.

References

1991 establishments in Norway
2008 disestablishments in Norway
Defunct magazines published in Norway
Magazines established in 1991
Magazines disestablished in 2008
Norwegian-language magazines
Sports magazines